The Minister of Defence (Rakshā Mantri) is the head of the Ministry of Defence and a high ranking minister of the Government of Nepal. The Defence Minister is one of the most senior offices in the Council of Ministers as well as being a high-level minister in the union cabinet.

List of Ministers of Defence  
This is a list of all ministers of Defense since the Nepalese Constituent Assembly election in 2013:

Reference

External links
 Official Website of Ministry of Defence

Lists of government ministers of Nepal